Kilusang Pagbabago is the informal name of a multi-party umbrella coalition formed by the supporters of the administration of Rodrigo Duterte and the 17th Congress of the Philippines. Headed by PDP–Laban, it has formed coalition agreements with the Nacionalista Party, Lakas–CMD, Nationalist People's Coalition and National Unity Party, as well as the Centrist Democratic Party and an independent congressional block of 24 party-list groups.

Coalition partners

Political parties

Party-lists 
The following is a list of party-lists associated with the coalition:

Non-political groups 
Mayor Rodrigo "Rody" Duterte-National Executive Coordinating Committee (MRRD NECC)
Volunteers Against Crime and Corruption (VACC)

Relationship with Hugpong ng Pagbabago 
In February 2018, President Rodrigo Duterte's daughter and Davao City Mayor Sara Duterte-Carpio founded Hugpong ng Pagbabago, a political party in Davao Region, aligned with Sara's umbrella coalition Tapang at Malasakit Alliance which also supported by four governors in the Davao region except for Douglas RA Cagas of Davao del Sur as well to Davao del Norte 2nd District Representative Antonio Floirendo Jr. who feuded with House Speaker Pantaleon Alvarez over corruption allegations against Floirendo. Sara Duterte accused Alvarez as a traitor as Alvarez allowed former Liberal Party members (notably Jeanette Garin and husband Iloilo Rep. Oscar Garin Jr.) to join PDP–Laban, her father's affiliation, and promised that she will campaign for Alvarez's potential foe in 2019. On July 23, 2018, Alvarez was ousted by the more than 180 colleagues in the House for speakership (although Alvarez still sat as the Speaker during President Duterte's SONA), and the media reported that Sara urged congresspeople to dethrone Alvarez and replace him with former President and Pampanga Rep. Gloria Macapagal Arroyo.

The CFC/PDP–Laban slate is endorsed by President Rodrigo Duterte with some differences with Senator Koko Pimentel. Duterte endorsed Freddie Aguilar who was denounced by Pimentel, with Pimentel adding independent Senator Grace Poe and former Senator Lito Lapid (replacing Aguilar) of the Nationalist People's Coalition to complete the 12-seat senatorial slate of the CFC/PDP–Laban. The Hugpong ng Pagbabago of Davao City mayor Sara Duterte is not endorsing Lapid and Poe, and instead is endorsing former senators Bong Revilla and Jinggoy Estrada, who are both involved in the pork barrel scam of Janet Lim-Napoles during the Aquino administration, in which Revilla was acquitted while Estrada was granted bail.

Senatorial slate

See also 
Hugpong ng Pagbabago

References

Organizations established in 2016
2016 establishments in the Philippines
2019 disestablishments in the Philippines
Defunct political party alliances in the Philippines
Federalism in the Philippines
Presidency of Rodrigo Duterte